Hagley Gap is a settlement in Saint Thomas parish in southeastern Jamaica.

Hagley Gap is roughly a 7-mile (11 km) hike from the Blue Mountain Peak, which is a destination for hiking and camping enthusiasts. In order to reach the peak at sunrise after the 3 to 5 hour hike, night time hikes are common. The peak has a view of both the north and south coasts of Jamaica.

The Blue Mountain Project (BMP) is a nonprofit organization which has partnered with the community of Hagley Gap. Over the last 12 years, they have built a medical clinic, brought internet access, and improved education in the community, as well as providing job training.

References

External links
 Hagley Gap

Populated places in Saint Thomas Parish, Jamaica
Blue Mountains (Jamaica)